Zaki Beyg-e Olya (also Romanized as Z̄akī Beyg-e ‘Olyā; also known as Z̄akī Beg-e ‘Olyā) is a village in Obatu Rural District, Karaftu District, Divandarreh County, Kurdistan Province, Iran. At the 2006 census, its population was 352, in 73 families. The village is populated by Kurds.

References 

Towns and villages in Divandarreh County
Kurdish settlements in Kurdistan Province